Rivière Bonnard Airport  is located near the Rivière Bonnard (Bonnard river) in Mont-Valin, Quebec, Canada.

This airport is used for fire protection aircraft (SOPFEU). It is only in operation during summer. Three Cessna 182 RG are based at this airport for fire patrol.

References

Registered aerodromes in Nord-du-Québec